Berkeley Castle (historically sometimes spelled as Berkley Castle or Barkley Castle) is a castle in the town of Berkeley, Gloucestershire, United Kingdom. The castle's origins date back to the 11th century, and it has been designated by English Heritage as a grade I listed building.

The castle has remained within the Berkeley family since they reconstructed it in the 12th century, except for a period of royal ownership by the Tudors. It is traditionally believed to have been the scene of the murder of King Edward II in 1327.

In 1956 Berkeley Castle was opened to visitors and remains open today.

Construction

The first castle at Berkeley was a motte-and-bailey, built around 1067 by William FitzOsbern shortly after the Conquest. This was subsequently held by three generations of the first Berkeley family, all called Roger de Berkeley, and rebuilt by them in the first half of the 12th century. The last Roger de Berkeley was dispossessed in 1152 for withholding his allegiance from the House of Plantagenet during the conflict of The Anarchy, and the feudal barony of Berkeley was then granted to Robert Fitzharding, a wealthy burgess of Bristol and supporter of the Plantagenets. He was the founder of the Berkeley family which still holds the castle.

In 1153–54, Fitzharding received a royal charter from King Henry II giving him permission to rebuild the castle. Fitzharding built the circular shell keep between 1153 and 1156, probably on the site of the former motte. The building of the curtain wall followed, probably during 1160–1190 by Robert and then by his son Maurice.

Much of the rest of the castle is 14th century and was built for Thomas de Berkeley, 3rd Baron Berkeley: Thorpe's Tower, to the north of the keep, the inner gatehouse to its southwest, and other buildings of the inner bailey.

Murder of Edward II

The castle was ransacked in 1326 by the forces of Hugh Despenser, the favourite of Edward II. Then in 1327, Edward was deposed by his wife Queen Isabella and her ally Roger Mortimer, and placed in the joint custody of Mortimer's son-in-law, Thomas de Berkeley, and de Berkeley's brother-in-law, John Maltravers. They brought Edward to Berkeley Castle, and held him there for five months from April to September. During that time a band of Edward's supporters attacked, entered the castle and rescued him, only for him to be recaptured soon afterwards. It is possible that his captors then moved him around between several castles to make further rescue more difficult, before returning him to Berkeley Castle in September. Some commentators have claimed that Edward's escape was actually successful, and that someone else was later murdered in his place.

Historical sources record that Edward was murdered there on 21 September 1327. Raphael Holinshed's Chronicles (1587 edition), drawing on earlier sources, describes Edward's murder in detail:they [the murderers] came suddenlie one night into the chamber where he laie in bed fast asléepe, and with heauie featherbeds or a table (as some [sources] write) being cast vpon him, they kept him down and withall put into his fundament [i.e., his anus] an horne, and through the same they thrust vp into his bodie an hot spit, or (as other [sources] haue) through the pipe of a trumpet a plumbers instrument of iron made verie hot, the which passing vp into his intrailes, and being rolled to and fro, burnt the same, but so as no appearance of any wound or hurt outwardlie might be once perceiued. His crie did mooue manie within the castell and towne of Berkley to compassion, plainelie hearing him vtter a wailefull noise, as the tormentors were about to murther him, so that diuerse [i.e., several] being awakened therewith (as they themselues confessed) praied heartilie to God to receiue his soule, when they vnderstood by his crie what the matter ment.Christopher Marlowe's tragedy Edward II (The troublesome raigne and lamentable death of Edward the second, King of England, first published 1594) depicts the murder at Berkeley Castle, using props mentioned in Holinshed, and popular stories of a red-hot poker or suffocation continue to circulate. The cell where Edward is supposed to have been imprisoned and murdered can still be seen, along with the adjacent 11 m (36 ft) deep dungeon, which supposedly echoes the events of the murder every year on 21 September. Holinshed's account records that, leading up to the murder, Edward's keepers "lodged the miserable prisoner in a chamber ouer a foule filthie dungeon, full of dead carrion, trusting so to make an end of him, with the abhominable stinch thereof: but he bearing it out stronglie, as a man of a tough nature, continued still in life."

The account given to Parliament at the time was that Edward had met with a fatal accident, but Holinshed and other historical sources record that great effort was made to keep the murder secret. The body was embalmed and remained lying in state at Berkeley for a month, in the Chapel of St John within the castle keep, before Thomas de Berkeley escorted it to Gloucester Abbey for burial. Thomas was later charged with being an accessory to the murder, but his defence was that it was carried out by the agents of Roger Mortimer while he was away from the castle, and in 1337 he was cleared of all charges.

Later history

In 1384 Katherine, Lady Berkeley, founded a school. This school still exists. It was unusual to found a school and she was one of the first people to found a small fully endowed school.

In the 14th century, the Great Hall was given a new roof and it is here the last court jester in England, Dickie Pearce, died after falling from the Minstrels' gallery. His tomb is in St Mary's churchyard which stands besides the castle. Adjoining the Great Hall was the Chapel of St Mary (now the morning room) with its painted wooden vaulted ceilings and a biblical passage, written in Norman French.

A dispute about the ownership of Berkeley Castle between Thomas Talbot, 2nd Viscount Lisle, and William Berkeley, 2nd Baron Berkeley, lead to the Battle of Nibley Green.

In the late 16th century Queen Elizabeth I visited the castle and played bowls on the bowling green.

During the First English Civil War, the castle was held by a Royalist garrison and was captured in 1645 by a Parliamentarian force under Colonel Thomas Rainsborough; after a short siege that saw cannon being fired at point-blank range from the adjacent church roof of Saint Mary the Virgin, the garrison surrendered. As was usual the walls were left breached after this siege, but the Berkeley family were allowed to retain ownership on condition that they never repaired the damage to the Keep and Outer Bailey; this is still enforced today by the Act of Parliament drawn up at the time. According to the Pevsner Architectural Guides the breach is partially filled by a subsequent 'modern' rebuild, but this only amounts to a low garden wall, to stop people falling 28 feet from the Keep Garden, the original Castle's "motte".

In the early 18th century the 4th Earl of Berkeley planted a pine that was reputed to have been grown from a cutting taken from a tree at the Battle of Culloden. Between 1748 and 1753 the tower on the top of the Church of St Mary, Berkeley, was demolished and rebuilt beside the church so that it would not impede the clear line of fire from the castle. In the early 20th century the 8th Earl of Berkeley repaired and remodelled parts of the castle and added a new porch in the same Gothic style as the rest of the building.

A restoration appeal was launched in 2006 to raise £5.5 million needed to renovate and restore the Norman building. The castle is the third-oldest continuously occupied castle in England, after the royal fortresses of the Tower of London and Windsor Castle, and the oldest to be continuously owned and occupied by the same family. It contains an antique four-poster bed that has been identified as the piece of furniture that has remained the longest in continuous use in the UK by the same family.

In modern culture
The castle was used for many scenes for the 2003 television film of The Other Boleyn Girl. More recently the castle and grounds have been used for the external shots of the Valencian castle in Galavant. In 2019, the castle – both interior and exterior – was used as a filming location for Season 2 of The Spanish Princess.

The castle is featured in an episode of the 2017 season of the genealogy documentary television series Who Do You Think You Are?, with American actress Courteney Cox looking into her ancestry. Cox learns that she is a 21-generation direct descendant of Thomas de Berkeley, 3rd Baron Berkeley and 22-generation descendant of de Berkeley's father-in-law, Roger Mortimer, 1st Earl of March – also learning of their parts in the murder of King Edward II of England at Berkeley Castle in 1327.

Two ships of the Royal Navy have been named Berkeley Castle after the castle, as has a Great Western Railway steam locomotive.

See also
 Castles in Great Britain and Ireland
 List of castles in England
 Berkeley Hunt

References

External links

Official Berkeley Castle website
Berkeley Castle history 1
Berkeley Castle history 2

Houses in Gloucestershire
Castles in Gloucestershire
Gardens in Gloucestershire
Grade I listed buildings in Gloucestershire
Historic house museums in Gloucestershire
Butterfly houses
Berkeley family
Motte-and-bailey castles
Grade II* listed parks and gardens in Gloucestershire
Berkeley, Gloucestershire